Experian Credit Services Singapore Pte Ltd (formerly DP Information Group). It is a Singapore credit and business information bureau formed in 1978.  it was considered the largest provider of credit and business information in Singapore. It was fully acquired in 2008, and now operates as Experian.

History 
DP Information Group was started by private individuals in 1978. Forty percent of it was acquired by Experian in October 2008. In late 2014 the company was fully acquired by Experian and fully rebranded to Experian in 2019.

Products 
Experian Credit Services Singapore Pte Ltd (formerly DP Information Network Pte Ltd), helps organisations lend responsibly and protect themselves and their customers from risk. Through Experian Bureaux, they collect and analyse the credit histories of over one billion people and businesses globally – sorting through information about the credit they applied for, whether or not their applications were successful, and how they paid the credit back.

Facilitated by their one stop portal, they compile and collect public information sourced from the Accounting and Corporate Regulatory Authority (ACRA), Singapore Courts and more. They turn this information into reports which are used by businesses such as financial institutions, law firms and government agencies. Decision makers across multinational corporations and the small and medium enterprises rely on their comprehensive database to make critical and time-driven decisions every day.

Experian develops credit rating and credit scoring models. Its custom credit ratings model for Singapore companies, based on a regression methodology; it is currently being used by Building and Construction Authority to evaluate top-tier construction companies.

Since 1986, the company has published the "Singapore 1000 & SME 500" (as of 2008, "Singapore 1000 & SME 1000"), an annual ranking of Singapore's most successful companies and small and mid-sized firms by financial performance. In recent years, it also started an annual companion ranking called the "Singapore International 100", recognising the nation state's largest companies by overseas revenue.

The company operates an SME advisory business – DP SME Advisory -  which helps local and foreign entrepreneurs set up their business in Singapore. It helps new enterprises with business services such as filing for licenses and corporate secretarial services etc.

Partnerships 
Experian has a partnership with RAM Holdings Berhad, a bond rating agency in Malaysia to set up RAM Credit Information Sdn Bhd, headquartered in Kuala Lumpur, Malaysia. It provides similar credit and business information for the Malaysian market.

Related Companies 
 Experian Credit Services Singapore Pte Ltd
 Experian Credit Bureau Singapore Pte Ltd
 DP Management Pte Ltd
 RAM Credit Information Sdn Bhd (Malaysia)

References

External links 
 Experian Official Site Official Site
 QuestNet Official Product Site

Financial services companies established in 1978
Service companies of Singapore
Credit rating agencies
Business services companies established in 1978
1978 establishments in Singapore